Poovalur is a panchayat town in Tiruchirappalli district in the Indian state of Tamil Nadu. Poovalur is just 3 km from its taluk headquarters Lalgudi. It lies on the Tiruchirappalli–Chidambaram national highway NH 227 . Generally the livelihood of this town's people is agriculture. Banana, paddy, and sugarcane are the notable crops grown in this area.

Demographics
 India census, Puvalur had a population of 7745. In 2007, Poovalur has 10,234 people.  It is a developing panchayat. Males constitute 50% of the population and females 50%. Puvalur has an average literacy rate of 76%, higher than the national average of 59.5%: male literacy is 84%, and female literacy is 69%. In Puvalur, 10% of the population is under 6 years of age.

Notable inhabitants
Trichy Sankaran, mridangam player and teacher

References

External links
 Government of Tamil Nadu: Poovalur
 Poovalur Sriji http://www.poovalur.com

Villages in Tiruchirappalli district